The 1932 Wyoming gubernatorial special election took place on November 8, 1932. Just several weeks into his second term, Republican governor Frank Emerson died in office. Secretary of State Alonzo M. Clark ascended to the governorship, and a special election was called for 1934. Clark ran for re-election, but was defeated in the Republican primary by State Treasurer Harry R. Weston. Meanwhile, former state senator Leslie A. Miller, the unsuccessful Democratic nominee against Emerson in 1930, once again ran for the office and won the Democratic primary. In the general election, another close election ensued. But Miller, likely aided by Franklin D. Roosevelt's strong performance in Wyoming in that year's presidential election, narrowly defeated Weston to win his first term as governor.

Democratic primary

Candidates
 Leslie A. Miller, former state senator, 1930 Democratic nominee for Governor
 T. D. O'Neil, former state highway commissioner

Results

Republican Primary

Candidates
 Harry R. Weston, Wyoming State Treasurer
 Alonzo M. Clark, incumbent governor
 E. W. Rowell, Mayor of Casper

Results

Results

References

1932 Wyoming elections
1932
Wyoming
November 1932 events in the United States
Wyoming 1932